General elections were held in Niger in 2004; the first round of the presidential elections was held on 16 November, with a run-off held alongside National Assembly elections on 4 December. The presidential elections were won by Mamadou Tandja of the National Movement for the Development of Society (MNSD). The MNSD also emerged as the largest party in the National Assembly, winning 47 of the 113 seats.

Electoral system
The President was elected using the two-round system. The 113 members of the National Assembly were elected by two methods; 105 from eight multi-member constituencies by proportional representation system and the remaining eight members in special single-member constituencies to ensure representation of national minorities.

Results

President
No candidate won a majority of votes in the first round, and a second round was held on 4 December between the two leading candidates – incumbent president Mamadou and Mahamadou Issoufou. All four of the candidates eliminated in the first round backed Tandja in the second round, and Tandja won the elections with 65.53% of the vote. International and local observers declared the entire process as free, fair, and transparent.

National Assembly

Aftermath
Following the election, MNSD-Nassara resumed its previous ruling coalition with junior partner Democratic and Social Convention, whose 22 seats give a 69-seat majority in the National Assembly.

References

Presidential elections in Niger
Elections in Niger
Niger
General
Niger
Niger